Turzino is a rural locality (a village) in Andreyevskoye Rural Settlement, Vashkinsky District, Vologda Oblast, Russia. The population was 56 as of 2002.

Geography 
Turzino is located 29 km north of Lipin Bor (the district's administrative centre) by road. Andreyevskaya is the nearest rural locality.

References 

Rural localities in Vashkinsky District